XO (also known as XO Records) is a Canadian record label founded by singer the Weeknd, his managers Wassim Slaiby and Amir "Cash" Esmailian, and his creative director La Mar Taylor. Slaiby also serves as the label's CEO. As of 2012, it operates as a subsidiary of Universal Music Group, and is distributed through Republic Records.

The label's current acts include the Weeknd, Belly, Nav and Chxrry22. The label has had six projects debut at number one on the Billboard 200: Beauty Behind The Madness, Starboy, My Dear Melancholy, Bad Habits, After Hours and Good Intentions, with the latter two both achieving this in the first half of 2020.

History
In 2011, the Weeknd, Wassim Slaiby, Amir Esmailian and La Mar Taylor founded XO as an unofficial imprint to release The Weeknd's three mixtapes; House of Balloons, Thursday, and Echoes of Silence. The mixtapes earned the Weeknd a following and recognition from mainstream publications, and helped grow the record label's reputation through various performances, song references and business ventures.

To this day, it’s still unconfirmed as to what the meaning of “XO” really is. Many fans argued that it means the idea of hugs and kisses whereas other fans argued that it means ecstasy and oxycontin. During The Weeknd’s early uprising of his career, there were times when he produced music, he did it under the influence of drugs. “There were songs on my first record that were seven minutes long."

When the Weeknd signed with Republic Records in 2012, XO was assumed as a subsidiary label. In 2015, rappers Belly and Derek Wise were signed to XO. In 2016, rapper Nav joined the label's roster. XO signed hip hop duo 88Glam in 2017, following the independent release of their self-titled mixtape. The duo left the label in 2020. Singer Black Atlass joined in 2018, he left the label in 2022. Singer Chxrry22 joined in 2022, becoming the first female artist signed to XO.

As of the 6th of June,2018, The Weeknd announced his new radio show “Memento Mori” run by his record label XO on Apple Music 1. The first show aired on the 8th of June,2018, where The Weeknd would play a mixture of songs that have influenced him in the music scene. Often, He would invite his fellow XO members as well for other musicians as guests to host their own episodes in the scene to share their own taste in music. Each episode is run in the span of 2 – 3 hours.

Roster

Current acts

Former acts

In-house producers

Discography
XO has officially released twelve studio albums, three EPs, and three compilation albums (including two greatest hits albums). Unofficially, the label has released twelve mixtapes.

Studio albums

EPs

Compilation albums

Mixtapes

References

 
Companies based in Toronto
Record labels established in 2012
Vanity record labels
Republic Records
Canadian record labels